Capurodendron is a genus of plants in the family Sapotaceae described by André Aubréville in 1962.

The entire genus is endemic to Madagascar, and with 33 described species and more than 20 new species still undescribed, it is the largest endemic genus of this island. The major part of its species are endangered or critically endangered of extinction by selective logging and the massive deforestation that Madagascar is suffering.

Selected species

References

Sapotaceae genera
Sapotoideae
Endemic flora of Madagascar
Taxa named by André Aubréville